Mithur (Idkidu) is a village in Bantwal Taluk, in the Dakshina Kannada district of Karnataka, India. Many Hindus and Muslims live here. The Mangalore-Puttur highway passes through the village.

Villages in Dakshina Kannada district